The Apple Tape Backup 40SC is an external, SCSI-interfaced,  QIC, mini-cartridge tape drive. It was first introduced by Apple Inc. in 1987 and discontinued in 1994. The drive came bundled with Retrospect backup software.  The drive is also compatible with the tape software included with A/UX.

Technical specifications

 Recording media: Industry-standard, DC 2000  QIC mini-cartridge.
 Formatted capacity: 38.5 megabytes.
 Block size:  8,192 bytes.
 Transfer rate: 1.25 megabyte per second.
 Interface:  SCSI. Connected directly to Macintosh Plus, Macintosh SE or Macintosh II via a 50-pin SCSI port or to a compatible hard disk drive.
 Volume backup time: Approximately 17–18 minutes per 20 megabytes.

See also
 List of Apple drives

References

External links
 Service manual

Macintosh peripherals
Apple Inc. peripherals
Products introduced in 1987
Tape-based computer storage